The Backstreet Cultural Museum is a museum in New Orleans, Louisiana's Tremé neighborhood, founded by Sylvester Francis.

Museum 
The museum's collections include objects relating to the African American culture of New Orleans with a special emphasis on jazz funerals, Mardi Gras Indians, and second line parades sponsored by Social Aid and Pleasure Clubs. The museum contains many priceless artifacts of African-American culture in New Orleans, including elaborate, brightly colored suits worn by Mardi Gras Indians in previous years, and rare photos of Mardi Gras Indian "gangs" from the 1940s. 

The museum is also a clearing house for information about Mardi Gras Indian and second-line events and serves as the location for some events, including the annual White Buffalo Day ceremony and procession that goes to Congo Square. As of July 12, 2022, the hours are 10 am to 4 pm, and general admission to the museum is by a donation of $20 (referred to by Mr. Francis as a "cover charge"). As in many other museums, videos inside are prohibited but limited photography is allowed.

In 2022, the museum moved to a new location at 1531 St. Philip St, New Orleans, Louisiana, 70116, from its previous location at 1116 St. Claude Avenue.

References

External links
Official website
National Geographic reporting on Backstreet Cultural Museum
New York Times New Orleans travel destinations

 

African-American cultural history
African-American history in New Orleans
African-American museums in Louisiana
Museums in New Orleans
Tremé